Vladislav F. Ribnikar (13 November 1871 – 1 September 1914) was a Serbian journalist, known for founding Politika, the oldest Serbian daily. He led the newspaper from the day it was founded in 1904 until his death in combat during the First World War.

Early life and education 
Vladislav F. Ribnikar was born in Trstenik, Serbia in 1871, the oldest of three sons of a Slovene doctor, Franjo Ribnikar from Carniola and his Serbian wife Milica Srnić from Kostajnica.

Ribnikar went to school in Jagodina and Belgrade. He studied history of philosophy at the University of Belgrade Faculty of Philosophy from 1888 to 1892. After graduation he continued his education in France where he received his master's degree from the Sorbonne in Paris then Berlin to study at the Humboldt University on a state scholarship.

Launching Politika 
The coup d'état of May 1903 which saw the end of the Obrenović dynasty in Serbia stopped him from finishing his PhD but the arrival of the Karadjordjevic dynasty to the throne brought democracy and freedom of the press for the first time in Serbia. Vladislav F. Ribnikar influenced by his experience in France and Germany decided to launch the first independent Serbian newspaper.

Ribnikar's wife, Milica "Milka" Čolak-Antić, a member of the Čolak-Antić family, daughter of Lt Colonel Lazar Čolak-Antić and descendant of renowned Vojvoda from the First Serbian uprising Čolak-Anta Simeonović, also believed in the need for an independent newspaper and invested her personal fortune into the endeavour. The idea to create an independent newspaper, without links to any of the political parties, was a novel idea in Serbia. as no one thought that an independent newspaper could survive without help from a political party, in addition there were already eleven daily party-oriented newspapers at the time. The first issue of Politika came out on 25 January 1904 with 2,450 copies printed, In only a few years it managed to become the most important daily in Serbia.

After studying in his native Svilajnac and Belgrade, following his graduation in Germany at the universities in Jena and Berlin, Ribnikar's younger brother Darko (1878–1914) and other brother Slobodan, a doctor, also joined Politika.

Death 

As a reserve officer of the Royal Serbian Army Ribnikar participated in the 1912–13 Balkan Wars, he was wounded twice, near Odrin (1912) and near Bregalnica (1913). After the outbreak of the First World War he was once again called back to active duty. Ribnikar was killed in action on 1 September 1914 in western Serbia, in the Sokolska planina mountain; the day before his youngest brother Darko reserve captain and editor-in-chief of Politika, was killed by an enemy shell. On 2 September 1914 Politika announced the death of its founder with a large banner headline.
After the death of the Ribnikar brothers, Vladislav's wife, Milica Čolak-Antić Ribnikar, became the pillar of Politika selling the family jewellery to revive the newspaper. In order to raise more money, she sold the family estate in Dedinje, Belgrade, to Regent Aleksandar Karadjordjević, the land where the Serbian royal residence, the White Palace, was later built.

Legacy 
On the occasion of the death of the Ribnikar brothers, Isidora Sekulić wrote a poem published in Politika of September 1914. In Trstenik a "Ribnikar Day" (Ribnikrevi dani) is organized in his honour. Vladislav Ribnikar has a street named after him in Trstenik

References

External links 
 Politika 100 years – The anniversary issue
 Politika website 

1871 births
1914 deaths
People from Trstenik, Serbia
20th-century Serbian people
Serbian journalists
University of Belgrade Faculty of Philosophy alumni
University of Paris alumni
Serbian people of Slovenian descent
Serbian military personnel killed in World War I
Burials at Serbian Orthodox monasteries and churches
Čolak-Antić family